Fetti is a collaborative studio album by American rappers Curren$y and Freddie Gibbs and record producer The Alchemist. It was released on October 31, 2018 for streaming and digital download by Jet Life Recordings, ESGN Records and ALC Records. Fetti was entirely produced by The Alchemist.

Background and release 
Fetti was first announced on January 4, 2017, through an Instagram post by Currensy.

On September 21, 2018, Currensy announced on Instagram that he had completed his half of the project. In the post, Currensy is recorded saying, “This message is to one Fredrick Gibbs. My half of Fetti is done. All produced by Alchemist." Gibbs would publicly respond to the post shortly after, commenting "N***a. send It. I’m by the booth.” On October 25, the tracklist and release date were posted by Gibbs on Instagram. In an interview with The Grinds TV, Gibbs stated that his half of the EP took two days to complete.

Within the 19 months following Fetti's initial announcement, Currensy released 12 projects while Gibbs released You Only Live 2wice and Freddie, his third and fourth studio albums.

In 2015, Gibbs and Currensy recorded a track titled "Fetti" for Welcome to Los Santos, a studio album produced by The Alchemist and Oh No to be included as a fictional in-game radio station in the Microsoft Windows version of Grand Theft Auto V. It is not confirmed whether the track had any relation to the conception of the EP.

Critical reception

“Fetti” received acclaim from critics. At Metacritic, the mixtape scored an 86 out of 100 based on four reviews.

In a positive review, Nathan Fisher of Clash Music praised the chemistry between the rappers, as well as commending the production: "despite the difference in the lyrical content delivered by Currensy and Gibbs, there is an unquestionable musical synergy between the two, and with Currensy and Alchemist already having completed two projects, it would be unsurprising if fans demanded something similar from Alchemist and Gibbs. Before its release, Fetti had the potential to be one of the strongest hip-hop albums of the year due to the skilled people involved and it has no doubt fulfilled that promise." Timmhotep Aku of Pitchfork wrote that Fetti is "a short, sweet, and potent mix, an example of the good that can happen when seasoned vets link up and operate under the radar and outside of the major label system." The production of the album was praised, stating that "The Alchemist is the centerpiece of the whole affair, the unseen ringleader whose presence is felt without him having to speak a word. He employs a production style that’s all about mood; using ’70s soul records to create the soundscape at the nexus of Blaxploitation soundtracks and eerie, ’80s-style synths."

Track listing 
All tracks produced by The Alchemist.

Personnel
Credits adapted from Freddie Gibbs' Twitter.

 Freddie Gibbs – primary artist
 Currensy – primary artist
 The Alchemist – primary artist, production
 Ann One – additional vocals 
 DJ J Rocc – cutting 
 Eddie Sancho – mixing
 Joe LaPorta – mastering
 Rich Gains – engineering
 Young Mexico – horns, keys

References 

2018 albums
Freddie Gibbs albums
Currensy albums
Albums produced by the Alchemist (musician)
Collaborative albums